Melivoia (Greek: Μελίβοια) is a town and a former municipality in the Larissa regional unit, Thessaly, Greece. Since the 2011 local government reform it is part of the municipality Agia, of which it is a municipal unit. Population 2,195 (2011). The municipal unit has an area of 197.633 km2. The seat of the municipality was in Kato Sotiritsa.  Melivoia is located east of Larissa, the capital of the regional unit and Thessaly, and a few kilometers north of Agia. The municipal unit stretches along the Aegean Sea coast, at the foot of Mount Ossa. It was named after the ancient city Meliboea. The municipal unit borders on Magnesia to the southeast.

Subdivisions
The municipal unit Melivoia is subdivided into the following communities (constituent villages in brackets):
Melivoia (Melivoia, Velika, Kokkino Nero, Koutsoupia, Paliouria)
Skiti (Skiti, Agiokampos, Kato Polydendri)
Sklithro (Isiomata, Rakopotamos)
Sotiritsa (Sotiritsa, Kato Sotiritsa)

Population

External links
 Melivoia (municipality) on GTP Travel Pages
 Melivoia (town) on GTP Travel Pages

See also
List of settlements in the Larissa regional unit

References

Populated places in Larissa (regional unit)